Sabash Satyam is a 1969 Indian Telugu-language science fiction film starring Krishna and Rajasree. The plot revolves around Satyam who falls in love with Chaya. When Satyam becomes invisible, he must find a way to become visible again and win his love.

Plot
Satyam, who works at his uncle Dayanand's cancer research facility, falls in love with Dayanand's daughter Chaya, but her family has different plans for Chaya. Chaya's relatives set up a lab accident, and Satyam is turned invisible. Now Satyam must find a way to become visible again and win his love.

Cast

Soundtrack

References

1969 films
1960s Telugu-language films
Indian fantasy films
Films about invisibility
Indian science fiction films